Valley of the Damned is the debut studio album by British power metal band DragonForce. In 2000, while the band was still known as DragonHeart, a demo of the same name was recorded and sent to Noise Records, subsequently gaining the band a deal with the label. It was then re-recorded in late 2002 and released as a full-length studio album on 25 February 2003, following the band's obtainance of the deal with Noise and change in name to DragonForce. The album was set to be remastered and released with a bonus DVD on 24 September 2007, but was subsequently delayed and eventually released on 22 February 2010, along with the re-release of the band's second album, Sonic Firestorm.

Production
The initial demo was recorded on 8 – 12 October and then mixed on 20 2000 at Thin Ice Studios with Karl Groom engineering. The rerecording for the album in 2002 mostly took place at Thin Ice Studios in Surrey, by Karl Groom, and at Lamer Luser Studios in London, by Herman Li, from May – October 2002. It was then mixed by Karl Groom, Herman Li and Sam Totman at Thin Ice Studios and mastered at Aubitt Studio by Rob Aubrey and Herman Li.

Reception

The Allmusic review by James Christopher Monger awarded the album 4 stars stating "The debut album from U.K. power metal giants Dragonforce is a polarizing affair. Valley of the Damned could be construed as a bloated, Spinal Tap-style tribute to early-'80s fantasy-metal, and in many ways it is; however, it's so well played and so joyously executed that it could very well reignite the entire genre... From the epic title track to the fist-pumping closer, "Heart of a Dragon," the guitar pyrotechnics of Herman Li and Sam Totman light up the sky like a third world war, bending riffs into melodic submission while never overplaying. Vocalist ZP Theart has no qualms about emulating heroes like Bruce Dickinson (Iron Maiden) and Michael Kiske (Helloween), but his lupine howls have a character all their own... Valley of the Damned may not be groundbreaking or cathartic, and lyrics like "In the land of desire with your heart filled with fire you live for the right to be free/We will sail on forevermore to the land of the evening star" may cross the line into heavy metal parody, but it's undeniably entertaining, expertly played, and endlessly fun."

In 2019, Metal Hammer ranked it as the 10th best power metal album of all time.

When asked about his thoughts of the album in a 2015 interview, Herman Li said:

Track listing
"Invocation of Apocalyptic Evil" contains a sample of "Malignant" from the soundtrack of Doom. "Black Fire" contains a sample of Kazunaka Yamane's theme from the Double Dragon video game series. The 2010 remastered edition physical copy contains a bonus DVD that includes interviews with the band members and producer Karl Groom on the making of the album, live footage of Valley of the Damned from their first Japanese tour in 2004, the backstage footage of the same show, two commentaries (one from Herman Li and Vadim Pruzhanov, and one from ZP Theart and Groom), and footage from the recording and mixing sessions for the album in Denmark.

Personnel

DragonForce
 ZP Theart – lead vocals
 Herman Li – guitars, backing vocals, mixing, mastering, engineering
 Sam Totman – guitars, mixing
 Diccon Harper – bass
 Vadim Pruzhanov - keyboards, piano
 Didier Almouzni – drums

Guest musicians
 Clive Nolan – backing vocals, additional keyboards

Technical personnel
 Karl Groom – recording, mixing, engineering
 Tommy Hansen – recording
 Rob Aubrey – mastering

Charts

References

External links
Valley of the Damned on the official website

2003 debut albums
DragonForce albums
Noise Records albums
Sanctuary Records albums
Albums produced by Karl Groom
Albums with cover art by Jean-Pascal Fournier